This is a list of managers of Deportivo de La Coruña, a Spanish professional football club based in the city of A Coruña, Galicia.

Managers

References 

Managers
Deportivo de La Coruna